Kelly Jarden (born 4 June 1973) is an association football player who represented New Zealand at international level.

Jarden made her Football Ferns début in a 1–3 loss to China on 21 November 1997, and finished her international career with 13 caps to her credit.

References

External links

1973 births
Living people
New Zealand women's international footballers
New Zealand women's association footballers

Women's association footballers not categorized by position